Shahruz Afghami (born 1962) is an Iranian politician.

Afghami was born in Malekan. He is a member of the 9th Islamic Consultative Assembly from the electorate of Malekan and member of Iran-Turkey Friendship society. Afghami won with 30,010 (51.07%) votes.

References

People from Malekan
Deputies of Malekan
Living people
1962 births
Members of the 9th Islamic Consultative Assembly